Nemanja Calasan (born 24 November 1985) is a Swiss professional basketball player of Serbian descent who currently plays in the Swiss Basketball League.

Before he joined the Starwings, he played professionally for other teams in Switzerland, Greece, Romania and France.

In 2018, he was the leading scorer of the Swiss Basketball League.

National team
He has been a member of the Swiss national team.

Personal
His parents were refugees who fled from modern-day Croatia when Nemanja Calasan was a child.

References

External links
Starwings Basel Profile
ESPN Profile
 

1985 births
Living people
AS Monaco Basket players
Centers (basketball)
Étoile Charleville-Mézières players
Fribourg Olympic players
JA Vichy players
KK Sutjeska players
Midland Chaps basketball players
Panionios B.C. players
Purdue Boilermakers men's basketball players
Serbian expatriate basketball people in Greece
Serbian expatriate basketball people in France
Serbian expatriate basketball people in Romania
Serbian expatriate basketball people in Switzerland
Serbian expatriate basketball people in the United States
Serbian men's basketball players
Serbs of Croatia
Sportspeople from Metković
Starwings Basel players
Swiss men's basketball players
Swiss people of Serbian descent
Yugoslav Wars refugees